Neil Geoffrey Armfield  (born 22 April 1955) is an Australian director of theatre, film and opera.

Biography
Born in Sydney, Armfield is the third and youngest son of Len, a factory worker at the nearby Arnott's Biscuits factory and Nita Armfield. He was brought up in the suburb of Concord, adjacent to Exile Bay. He was educated at the Homebush Boys High School where, in 1972, he was the Vice-Captain. In that year, Armfield directed the school's production of Milne's "Toad of Toad Hall" which garnered him the award of "Best Director" at the NSW High Schools Drama Festival.  When asked in 2019: “Who or what was your biggest influence?” Armfield said; “Lindsay Daines at Homebush State High School, who encouraged my theatrical aspirations.” He then went on to study at the University of Sydney, graduating in 1977, and became Co-Artistic Director of the Nimrod Theatre Company in 1979. He joined South Australia's Lighthouse Theatre before returning to Sydney in 1985, where he was involved in the purchase of Belvoir St Theatre and the formation of Company B, becoming its first Artistic Director in 1994.

In April 2008 he was selected as a participant in the Towards a creative Australia strand of the Australia 2020 Summit. Armfield announced in 2009 that the 2010 season would be his last as Belvoir Artistic Director, but he subsequently directed under his successor as Artistic Director Ralph Myers.

Armfield was appointed joint artistic director of the Adelaide Festival with Rachel Healy in 2017, with their original two-year term extended twice to 2023. This made them the longest serving artistic directors in the Festival's history.

Company B work
For Company B, he has directed

 Signal Driver
 State of Shock
 Aftershocks
 Master Builder
 The Diary of a Madman
 Diving for Pearls'
 The Tempest Ghosts Hate No Sugar Hamlet The Blind Giant is Dancing The Alchemist WASP The Seagull The Governor's Family As You Like It The Judas Kiss The Small Poppies Suddenly Last Summer The Marriage of Figaro Emma's Nose Aliwa My Zinc Bed Waiting for Godot The Underpants The Lieutenant of Inishmore Gulpilil The Spook The Fever Cloudstreet Picasso at the Lapin Agile Dead Heart A Cheery Soul Night on Bald Mountain Stuff Happens The Adventures of Snugglepot &Cuddlepie and Little Ragged Blossom Keating! Summer of the Seventeenth DollOpera Australia work
For Opera Australia he has directed works such as Jenůfa, The Eighth Wonder, Tristan und Isolde and Billy Budd.  In 2013, he directed Opera Australia's first full-length presentation of Richard Wagner's Ring Cycle, in Melbourne.

Companies worked with

Nimrod Theatre Company
State Theatre Company of South Australia
Queensland Theatre Company
Sydney Theatre Company
Seymour Group
Melbourne Theatre Company
Opera Australia
Welsh National Opera
Canadian Opera Company
Zurich Opera
English National Opera
The Royal Opera, Covent Garden
Lyric Opera of Chicago
Houston Grand Opera

Film
1986: Twelfth Night1991: The Castanet Club2006: Candy 
2015: Holding the ManAwards and honours

Australian
Officer of the Order of Australia for "... service to the arts, nationally and internationally, as a director of theatre, opera and film, and as a promoter of innovative Australian productions including Australian Indigenous drama." (January 2007)
Honorary Doctor of Literature at the University of Sydney (April 2006)
Sydney Theatre Critics Circle Award for Best Director and Best Production
1989, Major Award for Significant Contribution to Sydney Theatre
Several Green Room Awards
AFI Award for Best Director (Mini-series Edens Lost)
Several Helpmann Awards
Sidney Myer Performing Arts Award for Outstanding Achievement in the Performing Arts in Australia

International
Dublin Festival, Best Production (Cloudstreet)
Dora Mavor Moore Award, Canada, Best Director and Best Musical for Billy BuddBarclays Best Opera Production Award (Billy Budd'')
Jesse Kempf

References

External links

Talking Heads – Armfield interview by Peter Thompson for ABC1 (July 2010)

1955 births
Living people
Australian film directors
Australian theatre directors
Dora Mavor Moore Award winners
Helpmann Award winners
Officers of the Order of Australia
Australian opera directors
LGBT theatre directors
Australian LGBT people